Bird Songs is an album by the group Sphere featuring saxophonist Charlie Rouse, pianist Kenny Barron, bassist Buster Williams, and drummer Ben Riley that was recorded in 1988 and released on the Verve label. The album features compositions written by or associated with Charlie Parker and was Charlie Rouse's last recording with the group prior to his death.

Reception 

In his review on AllMusic, Stephen Cook states: "the band comes up with one of their finest releases and one of the most classic hard bop sessions since the heyday of Blue Note's '60s records. Rouse, fittingly enough, is in top form throughout, coming up with a bevy of rich and mature solo statements. Barron avails himself nicely as well. Highly recommended".

Track listing

Personnel 
Charlie Rouse – tenor saxophone
Kenny Barron – piano
Buster Williams – bass
Ben Riley – drums

References 

Sphere (American band) albums
1988 albums
Verve Records albums
Albums recorded at Van Gelder Studio